EAPL may refer to:

 East Africa Premier League
 Easton Area Public Library
 European Association of Psychology and Law
 Eilat-Ashkelon Pipeline